Persema, an acronym for Persatuan Sepakbola Malang is an Indonesian football club based in Malang, East Java. They currently compete in the Liga 3.

History 
The club was officially established in 1953, with primary funding from Malang's municipal budget. It was part of the Indonesian Super League until January 2011 when they hosted LPI's inaugural match and stopped relying on public funds. The other local team, Arema FC, is one of the most successful clubs in ISL. The team's nickname is "Bledeg Biru" while its home stadium is Gajayana Stadium.

Persema has never won a trophy during its years in the Indonesian Super League, mostly dwelling in the mid to bottom part of the table. The team was relegated into Indonesia's Division One (third-tier) in 2003. However, after two seasons, Persema bounced back to the second-tier league. Persema eventually gained promotion to the ISL in 2008 and stayed there until its 2011 shift to LPI.

Persema is now popular as the club that first hired European-born naturalized players Irfan Bachdim and Kim Jeffrey Kurniawan whose nominations to the Indonesia national under-23 football team in 2011 were cancelled by the Football Association of Indonesia because they chose to play in the breakaway league. Its coach Timo Scheunemann is a German who was born and bred in Indonesia and has become a father figure in Indonesia for Bachdim and Kurniawan. His ability to speak Indonesian and Javanese makes him popular among local journalists.

Current squad

Notable former players
Irfan Bachdim
Kim Kurniawan
Bima Sakti
Caue Benicio

References

External links
 

 
Football clubs in Indonesia
Football clubs in East Java
1953 establishments in Indonesia
Association football clubs established in 1953